The 1824 United States presidential election in Indiana took place between October 26 and December 2, 1824, as part of the 1824 United States presidential election. Voters chose five representatives, or electors to the Electoral College, who voted for President and Vice President.

During this election, the Democratic-Republican Party was the only major national party, and four different candidates from this party sought the Presidency. Indiana voted for Andrew Jackson over Henry Clay and John Quincy Adams. Jackson won Indiana by a margin of 12.87%.

Results

See also
 United States presidential elections in Indiana

References

Indiana
1824
1824 Indiana elections